Branko Bedekovič (born 14 March 1973) is a Slovenian handball player. He competed in the men's tournament at the 2000 Summer Olympics.

References

1973 births
Living people
Slovenian male handball players
Olympic handball players of Slovenia
Handball players at the 2000 Summer Olympics
Sportspeople from Celje